Mary K. Wells (December 1, 1920 – August 14, 2000) was an American television writer and actress. She acted on Return to Peyton Place, The Secret Storm, The Brighter Day, As the World Turns, Here Come The Waves, The Searching Wind, George Abbott's Three Men on a Horse, Any Wednesday (with Sandy Dennis), Edward Albee's Everything in the Garden, The Edge of Night (as Louise Grimsley Capice; Ray MacDonnell played her husband), Big Town (played Lorelei Kilbourne) and Love of Life.

She wrote for All My Children from 1973 to 1993. She was nominated for 14 Daytime Emmys and won twice (1985 & 1988). Her first nomination was shared with Agnes Nixon,  
Wisner Washam, Kiki McCabe and Jack Wood.

References

External links

 
 

1920 births
2000 deaths
American soap opera writers
American women screenwriters
20th-century American actresses
20th-century American women writers
American women television writers
Women soap opera writers
20th-century American screenwriters